Diplocarpa is a genus of fungi in the family Dermateaceae. It contains the single species Diplocarpa curreyana, described as new to science by English botanist George Edward Massee in 1895.

References

Leotiomycetes
Leotiomycetes genera
Taxa described in 1895